Zachary Thomas Ryan (born January 14, 1999) is an American professional soccer player who currently plays for Loudoun United.

Club career 
In 2019, Ryan originally signed with the San Francisco Glens in USL League Two, scoring three goals in three games before returning to Stanford University after the season.

On January 20, 2022, Ryan was signed to a one-year MLS Homegrown contract with the New York Red Bulls. He made his MLS debut on March 5, 2022 in a 4–1 win against Toronto FC after coming on as a substitute in the 90th minute. On May 10, 2022, Ryan scored his first goal as a professional, helping New York to a 3-0 victory over DC United as they advanced to Round of 16 in the 2022 U.S. Open Cup. Following the 2022 season, his contract option was declined by New York.

On January 14, 2023, Ryan joined USL Championship side Loudoun United.

International career 
In August 2013, Ryan participated in a U.S. U-14 National Team training camp in Pasadena, California.

Personal life 
Ryan was born in Chatham Borough, New Jersey, to Melissa and Frank Ryan. His father was a wrestler for Syracuse University and his uncle, Tom Ryan, is the head wrestling coach at Ohio State University. He has two younger brothers, Sean and Will. His brother, Sean, plays soccer at Ohio State University. Ryan attended Chatham High School, graduating in 2017.

Honors 
Source:
Stanford Cardinal
 NCAA Division I Men's Soccer Championship: 2017
 Pac-12 Conference: 2017, 2018, 2020

Individual
 MAC Hermann Trophy Semifinalist: 2020
Pac-12 Player of the Year: 2020
United Soccer Coaches ALl-America First Team: 2020
Top Drawer Soccer Bext XI Third Team: 2020
College Soccer News All-America First Team: 2020
United Soccer Coaches All-Far West Region: 2020, 2021
All-Pac-12: 2018, 2019, 2020, 2021
Top Drawer Soccer National Team of the Week: April 20, 2021
College Soccer News National Team of the Week: September 16, 2019; March 14, 2021
Pac-12 Player of the Week: February 23, 2021; April 20, 2021
College Soccer News All-Freshman First Team: 2018
Top Drawer Soccer Best XI Freshman Second Team: 2018
United Soccer Coaches Scholar All-America First Team: 2020
CoSIDA Academic All-America First Team: 2020, 2021
United Soccer Coaches Scholar All-Region: 2020, 2021
CoSIDA Academic All-District First Team: 2019, 2020, 2021
Pac-12 Academic Honor Roll: 2019, 2020
Pac-12 All-Academic Second Team: 2018

References

External links 
 
 Zach Ryan at Stanford Athletics
 
 

1999 births
Living people
American soccer players
Chatham High School (New Jersey) alumni
People from Chatham Borough, New Jersey
Sportspeople from Morris County, New Jersey
Stanford Cardinal men's soccer players
New York Red Bulls players
New York Red Bulls II players
Loudoun United FC players
Soccer players from New Jersey
Major League Soccer players